Chhabili is 1960 Hindi drama film directed by Shobhna Samarth under the banner of Shobhana Pictures. The film was made by Samarth to launch her daughter Tanuja.

Cast 
 Nutan
 K. N. Singh
 Tanuja
 Helen
 Agha
 Iftekhar
 Kaysi Mehra

Music 
Music and soundtrack for the film were by Snehal Bhatkar. The film has following tracks:

References

External links
 

1960 films
1960s Hindi-language films
Indian drama films